Enrique González (born 7 September 1945) is a Chilean boxer. He competed in the men's light welterweight event at the 1968 Summer Olympics.

References

External links
 

1945 births
Living people
Chilean male boxers
Olympic boxers of Chile
Boxers at the 1968 Summer Olympics
People from Antofagasta
Light-welterweight boxers
20th-century Chilean people
21st-century Chilean people